Drążgów (Polish: , also Drzązgów or Drążków) is a village, formerly a town, in the administrative district of Gmina Ułęż, within Ryki County, Lublin Voivodeship, in eastern Poland. The village has a population of 234.

History
The earliest known settlement on the present site of Drążgów belonged to the Pomeranian culture which occupied these territories between the 7th and the 3rd century BC. Later finds include a cemetery  belonging to the Przeworsk culture and an Early Medieval cemetery dated between 10th and 12th century CE. In 1337 a church and a parish were established here. In 1569 it was a small town located in Stężyca Land with 371 inhabitants working as craftsmen, distillers, and fishermen. In 1575 its owner, Mikołaj Złoczowski, converted the church to an Arian congregation; this lasted 30 years. In 1827 the town had a population of 138 living in 50 houses. By the end of the 19th century it had 394 inhabitants and 60 houses.

References

Villages in Ryki County